Intend, and its variations, may refer to:

 Intendant, the holder of a public administrative office in several countries
 Intended, a person engaged or betrothed to be married
 Intended reader, a member of a target audience
 Intending cross or memorial cross to commemorate an event

See also
 Intent (disambiguation)